A Shorter Story is the first extended play (EP) by British modern country-pop music duo Ward Thomas. The EP consists of five tracks which are covers of the duo's favourite pop songs reworked into their own style. Catherine and Lizzy said ’We've been playing around with cover versions as part of our acoustic Snug Sessions videos for a few years now and mostly they have gone down really well. We recorded the EP over two days and have tried to bring something new and different to each song whilst at the same time respecting the original versions. Hopefully people like them.'

Background
On March 30, 2017, Ward Thomas teased the release of new material on Twitter. The band played Shine during their 2017 Cartwheels Tour.

Track listing

Release history

References

2017 EPs
Country pop EPs
Ward Thomas (band) albums